MS Volendam is a Rotterdam-class (R-class) cruise ship belonging to Holland America Line. It was built in 1999 and sails out of Australia, Asia, and conducts cruises of the Inside Passage, traversing British Columbia and Alaska. She is the third ship in the fleet with that name, after SS Volendam (1922-1952) and SS Volendam (1972-1984).

Design and construction

Built by Fincantieri, Italy in 1999, Volendam is a Rotterdam-class (R-class) cruise ship, with three sister ships in the Holland America Line fleet; Zaandam, Amsterdam and Rotterdam. She follows the Rotterdam, the lead ship of her class, as the second ship launched in 1999. She has ten decks, and contains cabins for passengers (called staterooms) on six decks, with a ship's capacity of 1,432 guests.

The ship's theme is flowers, and she features floral designs throughout. The atrium contains a sculpture spanning three decks which was created by Luciano Vistosi. Volendam was christened by former professional tennis player Chris Evert on 12 November 1999, who became the ship's godmother.

Volendam was refurbished in 2006 and in 2011, when she entered dry dock for a refit in Singapore.

Service history 

Volendam first entered the Australian market in 2009. A visit to Batemans Bay during a trip circumnavigating Australia in 2010 was cancelled with 48 hours' notice due to "operational issues" which was interpreted by local media as a failure by the town's council to meet the requirements set out by Holland America regarding the town's wharf some twelve months prior to the expected arrival of the ship. During 2011 she was chartered to visit match relevant destinations during the 2011 Rugby World Cup, which was hosted in New Zealand.

In 2016, Volendam sails out of Australia/New Zealand and South Pacific, and during the Northern Hemisphere summer sails out of Vancouver, Canada, conducting cruises of the Inside Passage to Alaska. She hosted an Inside Passage cruise in September 2012 to celebrate a hundred years of the Vancouver Sun. In 2013 when Volendam returned to Australian waters, she visited Kangaroo Island for the first time, after a new landing pontoon was installed on the island to allow for it to become a cruise ship destination. After she left Australia for Asia, she visited a variety of Asian countries including Japan, China, South Korea and Vietnam.

On 9 March 2016 she witnessed a total solar eclipse in the Makassar Straight while sailing through Indonesia as part of an extended tour of Asia, hosting a number of astronomy groups and eclipse followers.

Coronavirus quarantine 

On 20 March 2020, due to port restrictions and border closures caused by the coronavirus pandemic, Volendam was forced to return to Port Everglades in Florida two days ahead of schedule, where passengers debarked, With crew stuck on board, the ship initially remained near the coast of the Bahamas. The pause in cruising was extended multiple times and eventually scheduled to end in May 2022.

Accommodation for Ukrainian refugees 
In May 2022, as a result of the Russian invasion of Ukraine, the City of Rotterdam chartered MS Volendam to be used as a refugee shelter for Ukrainian refugees for three months, with Holland America Line staff providing meals and services. Docked in the Merwehaven, the ship's charter was later extended to 14 September 2022.

In popular culture
In the 2005 film Into the Blue, Volendam makes a brief cameo when she was docked in the Prince George Wharf port of Nassau, Bahamas.

References

External links 

 HAL official site

Ships of the Holland America Line
Ships built in Monfalcone
Ships built by Fincantieri
1998 ships